Tokia Enrique Zidane Russell Jr (born 5 February 2000) is a Bermudian footballer who plays as a forward for Brockenhurst on loan from AFC Totton. He has also represented Bermuda at senior international level.

Club career
Growing up, Russell had a two year spell living in Spain that included a trial with Barcelona. During that time, he also played for the Cornellà academy alongside compatriate Kane Crichlow. In 2017, he joined Ilkeston Town. Later that year, he remained in England to study at Sparsholt College and played for the AFC Bournemouth academy. After returning from injury, he joined Cheadle Town before once again returning to play for PHC Zebras. In August 2022, he joined Southern League Division One South side AFC Totton and spent time on loan at Totton & Eling. Later in the year, he was on loan at fellow Wessex League side Brockenhurst and scored a hat-trick in a cup match against Romsey Town.

International career
Russell made his debut for Bermuda in March 2021, scoring in a 3–0 friendly win over the Bahamas.

Personal life
Russell's father Tokia was also a Bermudan international footballer, as well as his uncle Antwan Russell. His father gave him the middle name Enrique Zidane after Luis Enrique and Zinedine Zidane.

Career statistics

Scores and results list Bermuda's goal tally first, score column indicates score after each Russell goal.

References

External links

Profile at Wessex Football League

2000 births
Association football forwards
Bermuda international footballers
Bermuda youth international footballers
Bermudian footballers
PHC Zebras players
Ilkeston Town F.C. players
Cheadle Town F.C. players
A.F.C. Totton players
Southern Football League players
Totton & Eling F.C. players
Brockenhurst F.C. players
Expatriate footballers in England
Bermudian expatriate footballers
Bermudian expatriate sportspeople in England
Wessex Football League players
Bermudian expatriate sportspeople in Spain
Living people